The National Film and Television School (NFTS) was established in 1971 and is based at Beaconsfield Studios in Beaconsfield, Buckinghamshire, and it is located close to Pinewood Studios.

Awards & nominations
The students regularly get nominated (and sometimes win) international awards, even Oscars.

Examples includes The Hill Farm (Mark Baker),Second Class Mail (Allison Snowden) and A Grand Day Out (Nick Park)

2011

2010

2009

2008

2007

References

External links 
 
 NFTS page on myspace
 Official Animation Department website

Film schools in England
British television-related lists

de:National Film and Television School
fr:National Film and Television School